Ardorel Abbey, formally the Abbey of Our Lady of Ardorel, was a Benedictine then Cistercian monastery located in the modern-day commune of Payrin-Augmontel, Tarn, southwestern France. It was destroyed during the Wars of Religion.

History
The abbey was founded in the late 11th-century and followed the Rule of Saint Benedict. The establishment was mentioned in 1114. The name Ardorel possibly meant "ploughed land".

In 1124, under the influence of Bernard Ato IV's wife Cecil of Provence, monks from Cadouin Abbey founded a Cistercian monastery at Ardorel under the supervision of abbot Élie. Little is known about the Benedictines who settled there before the Cistercians. Oddly, Ardorel was listed as a daughter of Pontigny very late, in 1147. Cecil of Provence made numerous donations to the abbey, and wished to be buried there. After Élie went back to Cadouin, the first abbot of Ardorel was Foulque.

Cecil's donations to the abbey were made either directly or indirectly through her vassals, the lords of Vintrou, Hautpoul and Miraval. The abbey was so well-known that even some Cathars like Jordan of Saissac, the son of Bertrand of Saissac, made donations to the abbey in 1283.

Very soon, the prospering abbey founded two daughter houses: Valmagne Abbey in 1138 –which thrived on its turn with up to 300 monks– and Sira in 1139. Moreover, Jau Abbey became a daughter house of Ardorel in 1162, even though it was founded earlier.

In the 14th century, the reputation and the prosperity of Ardorel started declining, especially when the commendatory regime was set up.

In 1586, during the French Wars of Religion, a relative of the abbot of Ardorel who secretly converted to Calvinism slipped inside the monastery and opened the doors for spadassins to slaughter the monks and throw their corpses into a well. A few survivors, who had left the monastery earlier, resumed monastic life in a grange in Lempaut owned by Ardorel. The once prosperous abbey is now ruined.

According to Janauschek, Ardorel Abbey had the Order number CCLXXIV (274).

List of abbots 
The abbots of Ardorel listed by Dom Claude de Vic and Dom Joseph Vaissette in Histoire générale du Languedoc.

See also
List of Cistercian monasteries in France

References

Bibliography
 
 

Former Christian monasteries in France
Cistercian monasteries in France
12th-century establishments in France
12th-century religious buildings and structures
Buildings and structures in Tarn (department)
Destroyed Christian monasteries
French Wars of Religion